The 1967 San Francisco 49ers season was the franchise's 18th season in the National Football League and their 22nd overall. The 49ers had two first-round picks and drafted Heisman Trophy winner Steve Spurrier with one of those draft picks.

Offseason

NFL Draft

Roster

Regular season

Schedule

Game summaries

Week 14

Standings

Awards and records

References

External links 
 1967 49ers on Pro Football Reference
 49ers Schedule on jt-sw.com

San Francisco 49ers
San Francisco 49ers seasons
San Fran